In soil science, podzols are the typical soils of coniferous or boreal forests and also the typical soils of eucalypt forests and heathlands in southern Australia. In Western Europe, podzols develop on heathland, which is often a construct of human interference through grazing and burning. In some British moorlands with podzolic soils, cambisols are preserved under Bronze Age barrows.

Term 
Podzol means "under-ash" and is derived from the Russian под (pod) + зола́ (zola); the full form is "подзо́листая по́чва" (podzolistaya pochva, "under-ashed soil"). The term was first given in middle of 1875 by Vasily Dokuchaev. It refers to the common experience of Russian peasants of plowing up an apparent under-layer of ash (leached or E horizon) during first plowing of a virgin soil of this type.

Characteristics 
Podzols can occur on almost any parent material but generally derive from either quartz-rich sands and sandstone or sedimentary debris from magmatic rocks, provided there is high precipitation. Most Podzols are poor soils for agriculture due to the sandy portion, resulting in a low level of moisture and nutrients. Some are sandy and excessively drained. Others have shallow rooting zones and poor drainage due to subsoil cementation. A low pH further compounds issues, along with phosphate deficiencies and aluminum toxicity. The best agricultural use of Podzols is for grazing, although well-drained loamy types can be very productive for crops if lime and fertilizer are used.

It is formed under moist, cool and acidic conditions, especially where the parent material, such as granite or sandstone, is rich in quartz. The bleached soil horizon, which always has a higher value than the horizons above and below it, goes over into a red or red-brown horizon (so-called Podzolic B). The colour is strongest in the upper part, and change at a depth of  progressively to the part of the soil that is mainly not affected by processes; that is the parent material. The soil profiles are designated by the letters A (topsoil), E (eluviated soil), B (subsoil) and C (parent material).

In some Podzols, the E horizon is absent—either masked by biological activity or obliterated by disturbance. Podzols with little or no E horizon development are often classified as brown Podzolic soils, also called Umbrisols or Umbrepts.

Geographic distribution

Podzols cover about  worldwide and are usually found under sclerophyllous woody vegetation. By extent Podzols are most common in temperate and boreal zones of the Northern Hemisphere but they can also be found in other settings including both temperate rainforests and tropical areas.

In South America Podzols occur beneath Nothofagus betuloides forests in Tierra del Fuego.

Podzolization 

Podzolization (or Podsolization) is complex soil formation process by which dissolved organic matter and ions of iron and aluminium, released through weathering of various minerals, form organo-mineral complexes (chelates) and are moved from the upper parts of the soil profile and deposit in the deeper parts of soil. Through this process, the eluvial horizon becomes bleached and of ash-grey colour. The  complexes move with percolating water further down to illuviated horizons which are commonly coloured brown, red or black as they accumulate and consist of cemented sesquioxides and/or organic compounds. The podzolization is a typical soil formation process in Podzols.

Preconditions 
Podzolization usually occurs under forest or heath vegetation and is common in cool and humid climates as these climates inhibit the activity of soil microbes in the topsoil. Overall, podzolization happens where the decomposition of organic matter is inhibited and as a result, acidic organic surface (mor) layers build up. Under these typically acidic conditions, nutrient deficiency further hampers the microbial degradation of organic complexing agents. Medium to coarse textured soils with base-poor parent material (usually rich in quartz) also promote podzolization, as they encourage percolating water flow.

Key steps 

The soil-forming process of podzolization can be broken down into two main steps:

 Mobilization and translocation of organic matter, Fe and Al from the surface horizon, and
 Immobilization and stabilization of organic matter, Fe and Al into the subsoil.

In the topsoil of acidic soils, organic matter (mostly from plant litter, the humus layer and root exudates) together with Al- and Fe-ions, form organo-mineral complexes. These soluble chelates then relocate with percolating water from the A (or E horizon) to the B horizon. As a result of this, the E horizon (or Ae horizon in the Canadian system of soil classification) is left bleached and ash-grey in colour, while the B horizon becomes enriched with relocated organo-mineral complexes. The colour of B horizon is consequently red, brown or black, depending on the dominance of metal ions or organic matter. Usually, the boundary between the B and eluvial Ae (or E) horizon is very distinct, and sometimes a hardpan (or Ortstein) can form, as the relocated Fe and Al and organic matter increase mineral particles, cementing them  into this compacted layer.

There are several reasons why these organo-mineral complexes immobilize in the B horizon: If during the eluviation process more Al- or Fe-ions bind to the organic compounds, the complex can flocculate as the solubility of it decreases with increasing metal to carbon ratio. Apart from that, a higher pH (or higher Ca content) in the lower soil horizons can result in the breakdown of metal-humus complexes. In the lower soil layers, the organic complexing agents can be degraded by functioning microorganisms. Already established complexes in the B horizon can act as a filter, as they adsorb the traveling complexes from the upper soil horizons. A decreased water conductivity due to higher clay content can also result in the early flocculation of organo-mineral complexes.

The relocated substances can sometimes separate in the illuvial horizons. Then, organic substances are mostly enriched in the uppermost part of the illuvial horizon, whereas Fe- and Al-oxides are mostly found in the lower parts of the illuvial horizon.

Podzolization also promotes the relocation of some nutrients (Cu, Fe, Mn, Mo and P) that sometimes brings them closer to plant roots.

In different soil classification systems 
The term Podzols is used in the World Reference Base for Soil Resources (WRB) and in many national soil classification systems (in some of them, spelled Podsols).

 The USDA soil taxonomy  and the Chinese soil taxonomy call these soils Spodosols.
 The Canadian system of soil classification matches Podzols with soils under the Podzolic order (e.g. Humo-Ferric Podzol).
 The Australian Soil Classification uses the term Podosols.
 The Brazilian Soil Classification System calls them Espodossolos.

See also 
 Soil type

References

Further reading
 W. Zech, P. Schad, G. Hintermaier-Erhard: Soils of the World. Springer, Berlin 2022, Chapter 3.3.3.

External links 

 
 
 
 The Podzolic Order
 Podzol http://classification.soilweb.ca/podzol/
 http://edafologia.ugr.es/revista/tomo9b/a107text.pdf
 http://www.bauing.uni-wuppertal.de/boden/downloads_save/Podsol_Boden%20des%20Jahres_2007_JPNSS.pdf
 profile photos (with classification) WRB homepage
 profile photos (with classification) IUSS World of Soils

Pedology
Types of soil